Ciné 12 is a television channel, owned by the Mauritius Broadcasting Corporation, which broadcasts French and English TV shows and films.

Programming  

 Fringe
 Desperate Housewives
 Painkiller Jane
 La Maison d'à Côté
 Sacrifice De Femme
 Un Palace Pour Deux
 Downton Abbey
 Bones 
 L'Heure de La Peur
 Sons of Anarchy
 Alphas
 US Marshals : Protection de témoins

Former programming 

 Pobre Diabla
Psych
Gossip Girl
Half and Half
Ugly Betty
The Wizards of Waverly Place
Everybody Hates Chris
Knight Rider
Terra Nova
Glee

 Un Palace Pour Deux 
 Homeland season 3
 Against the Wall
 Fringe season 4
 Scandal 2
 The Good Wife season 4
 Hawaii 5-0 season 4
 Nikita 
 Rosario
 Bones season 9
 Grimm
 Salvation
 Sanctuary
 The Blacklist
 The Mentalist
 Chicago Med
 White Collar
 Dexter
 Sons of Anarchy
 The Secret Circle
 Revenge
 The Magicians
 Being Human
 CSI: Miami
 Counterpart
 Supernatural
 Charmed
 The Vampire Diaries

See also
 Kids Channel (Mauritian TV channel)
 MBC 1 (Mauritian TV channel)
 MBC 2 (Mauritian TV channel)

Television channels in Mauritius
Mauritius Broadcasting Corporation